Duffy Peak is a peak southeast of Hageman Peak in the Staccato Peaks, southwest Alexander Island, Antarctica. Dargomyzhsky glacier extends and flows west from the base of Duffy Peak and enters the nearby Bach Ice Shelf. The peak was photographed from the air by Lincoln Ellsworth in 1935, and was named by the Advisory Committee on Antarctic Names for Lieutenant Commander Joseph A. Duffy, a U.S. Navy aircraft pilot in Squadron VXE-6 during Operation Deep Freeze, 1969 and 1970.

See also

 Gluck Peak
 Lamina Peak
 Copland Peak

References 

Mountains of Alexander Island